Osvaldo Scandola (born 18 October 1939) is an Argentine sports shooter. He competed in the men's 25 metre rapid fire pistol event at the 1976 Summer Olympics.

References

1939 births
Living people
Argentine male sport shooters
Olympic shooters of Argentina
Shooters at the 1976 Summer Olympics
Place of birth missing (living people)